William Stephen Poyntz (20 January 1770 – 8 April 1840) was an English Whig and Liberal politician who sat in the House of Commons variously between 1800 and 1837.

Early life
Poyntz was the son of William Poyntz of Midgham (d.1809) by his wife Isabella (d.1805), daughter and co-heir of Kellond Courtenay of Painsford in Devon. His father, the eldest son of the courtier and diplomat Stephen Poyntz, was a brother of Georgiana Spencer, Countess Spencer, and hence William Stephen Poyntz's paternal first cousins were George Spencer, 2nd Earl Spencer, the Duchess of Devonshire and the Countess of Bessborough. His maternal first cousins and brothers-in law (through the marriages of his sisters Isabella and Carolina) were Edmund Boyle, 8th Earl of Cork, and Vice-Admiral Sir Courtenay Boyle.

He matriculated at Christ Church, Oxford in 1787.

Career
In June 1800, Poyntz was elected at a by-election as a Member of Parliament (MP) for St Albans and held the seat until the 1807 general election. He was next elected as MP for Callington at a by-election in April 1810,
and held the seat until the 1818 general election. In February 1823 he was elected at a by-election as MP for Chichester,
and held the seat until the 1830 general election. In March 1831 Poyntz was elected at a by-election as MP for Ashburton,
where he was re-elected in May 1831
and held the seat until the 1835 general election, when he was elected MP for Midhurst.
He was re-elected in 1837,
and held the seat until his resignation later in 1837 by taking the Chiltern Hundreds.

Personal life
On 1 September 1794, Poyntz married the Hon. Elizabeth Mary Browne, daughter of Anthony Browne, 7th Viscount Montagu, and sister and heir of her brother the 8th Viscount. They lived at Midgham House in Berkshire and at Cowdray Park in West Sussex. Together, they had several children. Their two sons both drowned at Bognor Regis on 7 July 1815. Only two of their daughters had issue:
Elizabeth Georgina Poyntz, who married Frederick Spencer, 4th Earl Spencer
Isabella Poyntz, who married Brownlow Cecil, 2nd Marquess of Exeter.

Poyntz died at the age of seventy.

Arms

The arms of the head of the Poyntz family of Cowdray Park are blazoned Barry of eight gules and or.

References

External links

1770 births
1840 deaths
Whig (British political party) MPs
Members of the Parliament of Great Britain for English constituencies
British MPs 1796–1800
Members of the Parliament of the United Kingdom for Ashburton
UK MPs 1832–1835
UK MPs 1801–1802
UK MPs 1802–1806
UK MPs 1806–1807
UK MPs 1807–1812
UK MPs 1812–1818
UK MPs 1820–1826
UK MPs 1826–1830
UK MPs 1830–1831
UK MPs 1831–1832
UK MPs 1835–1837
Alumni of Christ Church, Oxford
People from Thatcham
People from Midhurst
Members of the Parliament of the United Kingdom for Callington